Joachim I may refer to:

 Joachim I, Primate of Bulgaria in 1232–1246
 Patriarch Joachim I of Constantinople (r. 1498–1502 and 1504)
 Joachim I Nestor, Elector of Brandenburg (1484–1535)
 Patriarch Joachim of Alexandria (r. 1486–1567)
 Patriarch Joachim of Moscow and All Russia (1620–1690)
 Joachim I of Naples (1767–1815)